Siri Thoresen (born 1 September 1962) is a Norwegian psychologist and an expert on military psychology. She is a Research Professor at the Norwegian Centre for Violence and Traumatic Stress Studies. Her research focuses on psychological trauma as a result of war, catastrophe and terrorism, including psychological trauma in military personnel, and on sexual abuse.

She became a licensed clinical psychologist in 1990 and obtained a dr.psychol. (PhD) degree at the University of Oslo in 2006. She worked as head of the Psychological Centre in Tuzla, Bosnia-Hercegovina in 1994. She then worked as a clinical psychologist at the Stress Management Team for International Military Operations at the Norwegian Armed Forces Joint Medical Centre. In 2005 she became a senior researcher at the Norwegian Centre for Violence and Traumatic Stress Studies, and in 2016 she was promoted to research professor.

References

External links

Norwegian psychologists
Norwegian women psychologists
Norwegian Centre for Violence and Traumatic Stress Studies people
University of Oslo alumni
21st-century women scientists
1962 births
Living people